Mrs. Wormwood is a fictional character.

It may refer to:

A minor character in The Sarah Jane Adventures
Miss Wormwood, a minor character in comic strip Calvin & Hobbes
Mrs. Wormwood (Matilda), a minor character in the Roald Dahl novel Matilda